Port Ainé is a ski resort located in Rialp, in the Catalan Pyrenees, inaugurated in 1986. The ski area extends from 1,650 to 2,440 meters.

Cycling 

In March 2013, Port Aîné hosted the fourth stage of the Volta a Catalunya . Daniel Martin won at the top ahead of Joaquim Rodríguez and at the same time became the leader of the race. 
In 2016, the resort received the final of a new stage of the Tour de Catalogne during the 4th  stage. Thomas De Gendt won after a breakaway while Nairo Quintana managed to grab the leader's jersey he took from Dan Martin by releasing the other favorites Richie Porte and Alberto Contador in the last kilometer. Esteban Chaves won  the stage finishing at Port Ainé in the 2021 edition.

External links
Port Ainé website

References

Ski areas and resorts in Catalonia
Climbs in cycle racing in Spain
Geography of Catalonia
Sport in Catalonia